Gimcheon Station is a railway station on the Gyeongbu Line and the Gyeongbuk Line.

External links
 Cyber station information from Korail

Railway stations in North Gyeongsang Province
Gimcheon
Railway stations in Korea opened in 1905